= Bagarauda =

- village
- Location within Madhya Pradesh Location within India
- Coordinates: 23.1625145°N 77.5375794°E
- Country: India
- State: Madhya Pradesh
- District: Bhopal
- Tehsil: Huzur
- Elevation: 457 m (1,499 ft)

Population (2011)
  - Total: 2,412
- Time zone: UTC+5:30 (IST)
- ISO 3166 code: MP-IN
- 2011 census code: 482450

Bagarauda is a village in the Bhopal district of Madhya Pradesh, India. It is located in the Huzur tehsil and the Phanda block.

== Demographics ==
According to the 2011 census of India, Bagarauda has 404 households. The effective literacy rate (i.e. the literacy rate of population excluding children aged 6 and below) is 80.38%.

Demographics (2011 Census)
	Total	Male	Female
Population	2412	1280	1132
Children aged below 6 years	317	174	143
Scheduled caste	431	230	201
Scheduled tribe	45	27	18
Literates	1684	977	707
Workers (all)	1238	745	493
Main workers (total)	1011	664	347
Main workers: Cultivators	412	339	73
Main workers: Agricultural labourers	535	270	265
Main workers: Household industry workers	6	5	1
Main workers: Other	58	50	8
Marginal workers (total)	227	81	146
Marginal workers: Cultivators	7	4	3
Marginal workers: Agricultural labourers	209	74	135
Marginal workers: Household industry workers	0	0	0
Marginal workers: Others	11	3	8
Non-workers	1174	535	639
